The 1990 State of Origin series saw the ninth time that the annual three-game series between New South Wales and Queensland representative rugby league football teams was contested entirely under "state of origin" selection rules. It was the first year that the Australian Rugby League took an Origin match to Melbourne to showcase the code in Victoria. New South Wales broke an eight-game losing streak in game I and took the series for the first time since 1986.


Games

Game One

Game I at the Sydney Football Stadium was a typical Origin arm-wrestle and resulted in the lowest score in the series' 10-year history to that point. Queensland's Wally Lewis withdrew pre-match due to a hamstring tear (only the 2nd Origin match he had missed in the series' history), Maroon's hero Gene Miles had retired and Tony Currie, Michael Hancock and Kerrod Walters were all out with injuries.

New South Wales' captain Benny Elias played what was regarded as his finest representative performance   with a copybook dummy-half display.  Blues' centre Mark "Sparkles" McGaw scored the only try of the match. He outplayed his opposite, the  Mal Meninga and pulled off a covering tackle on winger Alan McIndoe that was so comprehensive that both McIndoe's boots came flying from his feet. The win was the Blues' first since the post-series exhibition match in 1987.

Game Two

The public relations exercise to showcase the game in Melbourne proved a success with a sell-out crowd of 25,800 cramming into Olympic Park. The game was highlighted by NSW halfback Ricky Stuart racing 70 metres to score, easily outpacing Qld winger Les Kiss who made no ground on the former Wallaby.

Queensland halfback Allan Langer's stealing of the ball from Blues replacement prop Glenn Lazarus  helped spell the end of three years of Queensland State of Origin dominance which had included two consecutive series clean sweeps from 1988. Langer's steal was a defining moment giving Rod Wishart the chance to put the Blues ahead 8-6. Shortly afterwards Brad Mackay swooped on an intercept and streaked away for the try that put the game out of reach for the Maroons.

Game Three

In Game III the Blues led 10-4 after just 24 minutes and looked set for a series whitewash. Then the Maroons clawed back to 10-all early in the second half with their Origin "King" Wally Lewis landing a wide conversion after Gary Belcher had taken the earlier kicks. Western Suburbs Magpies' forward Steve Jackson who the year before had scored a Grand Final try to give his club the Canberra Raiders the premiership, scored an almost identical try to give Queensland the game and a face-saving sole victory in the series.

Teams

New South Wales

Queensland

See also
1990 NSWRL season

References

Sources
 Big League's 25 Years of Origin Collectors' Edition, News Magazines, Surry Hills, Sydney

State of Origin series
State of Origin series